Philonome albivittata is a species of moth from the Tineidae family found in French Guiana.

The length of the forewings is 2.8–3.1 mm. The forewings are reddish brown with a brown costa. The longitudinal fascia is white, spanning the entire costal area except the costa. It has a sinuous lower margin and is accompanied with a narrow, dark brown line. The dorsal bar is white and found at the basal third of the dorsum. It is dentiform and accompanied with a dark brown bar along the upper margin. The marginal area is dark brown. The hindwings are brownish grey.

Etymology
The species name refers to the white longitudinal band on the forewings and is derived from Latin albus (meaning white) and vittatus (meaning banded).

References

External links

Moths described in 2015
Tineidae